Local history is the study of history in a geographically local context, often concentrating on a relatively small local community. It incorporates cultural and social aspects of history. Local history is not merely national history writ small but a study of past events in a given geographical area which is based on a wide variety of documentary evidence and placed in a comparative context that is both regional and national. Historic plaques are one form of documentation of significant occurrences in the past and oral histories are another.

Local history is often documented by local historical societies or groups that form to preserve a local historic building or other historic site. Many works of local history are compiled by amateur historians working independently or archivists employed by various organizations. An important aspect of local history is the publication and cataloguing of documents preserved in local or national records which relate to particular areas.

In a number of countries a broader concept of local lore is known, which is a comprehensive study of everything pertaining to a certain locality: history, ethnography, geography, natural history, etc.

Local contexts

Local history tends to be less documented than other types, with fewer books and artifacts than that of a country or continent. Many local histories are recorded as oral tales or stories and so are more vulnerable than more well known issues. Artifacts of local history are often collected in local history museums, which may be housed in a historic house or other building. Individual historic sites are inherently local, although they may have national or world history importance as well. Many however have little overall historical impact but add depth to the local area.

Australia

In Australia, local history is focussed on specific cities and suburbs or country towns and regions. In cities, local history might concentrate on a CBD and its bordering suburbs, on a specific suburb or municipality, or on an agglomeration of suburbs and municipalities (because local government boundaries have changed over time). Outside the larger cities, local history often examines regional towns and surrounding areas.

Records are typically stored at state libraries, public libraries, historical societies and public record offices. For example, the State Library of Victoria holds extensive local history records for Melbourne and other places in Victoria. Many other Melbourne libraries have local history collections, along with the Public Record Office Victoria and the Royal Historical Society of Victoria. In New South Wales, the Royal Australian Historical Society has studied local history as part of its remit since its founding in 1901. It holds local history records along with the State Library of NSW and other state and local libraries and archives.

Historians have examined the ways local history has been written in Australia since the nineteenth century. Early on, the emphasis was on pioneer and settler history. The creative ways that local history contributed to making community has also been argued. Subsequently, local history, urban history, public history and heritage were closely connected in Australia.

United Kingdom

The British Association for Local History in the United Kingdom encourages and assists in the study of local history as an academic discipline and as a leisure activity by both individuals and groups. Most historic counties in England have record societies and archaeological and historical societies which coordinate the work of historians and other researchers concerned with that area.

Local history in the UK took a long time to be accepted as an academic discipline. In the 18th and 19th centuries, it was widely regarded as an antiquarian pursuit, suitable for country parsons. The Victoria History of the Counties of England project begun in 1899 in honour of Queen Victoria with the aim of creating an encyclopaedic history of each of the historic counties of England. The project is coordinated by the Institute of Historical Research at the University of London. The first academic post related to local history was at Reading University which appointed a research fellow in local history in 1908. There was a department of local history (but without a professor) at Leicester University from 1947. H. P. R. Finberg was the first Professor of English Local History. He was appointed by Leicester in 1964. Local history continues to be neglected as an academic subject within universities. Academic local historians are often found within a more general department of history or in continuing education.

Local history is rarely taught as a separate subject in British schools. In 1908, a Board of Education circular had urged that schools should pay attention "to the history of the town and district" in which they were situated. In 1952, the Ministry of Education suggested schools should use local material to illustrate national themes. Within the current National Curriculum, pupils at level 4 are expected to "show their knowledge and understanding of local, national and international history".'The Alan Ball Local History Awards were established in the 1980s to recognize outstanding contributions in local history publishing in the UK (both in print and in new media), and to encourage the publishing of such works by public libraries and local authorities.

Local history can become a crucial component to policy-making and serve as a marketable resource and this is demonstrated in the case of Northern Ireland. Aside from its contribution to local development, local history is being used as a non-contentious meeting ground in addressing conflicting traditions by reinforcing shared past rather than adversarial political history.

United States
In the United States, local history is usually concentrated on any history of the place and people from a particular village or township. Several villages and townships would comprise one county or county history. Library records are often divided by State, then county, then township/local history. The American Association for State and Local History is the professional association for history professionals, volunteers, museums, historical societies, and other history-related organizations and public history professionals

In the United States, 79,000 historic sites are identified as listings on its National Register of Historic Places. State and local municipalities often have additional landmark designations to cover sites of more purely local interest.

In addition, many regional and state historical societies maintain regional history and actively seek out missing historical collections.

A new form of local history is the movement of "If This House Could Talk" projects in various urban neighborhoods in the United States. These small scale locally generated history events encourage an interest in history and provide for open-ended participation by the general public. However, there is often no vetting or third-party review of the factual evidence that is presented, and therefore such presentations may require oversight by professional third-party history organizations if they are to be transcribed into ongoing collections of local history.

 Slavic countries 

In several Slavic countries there is a related study which may be translated from the local languages as "country lore" or "local lore". In addition to history, it also incorporates other local studies, such as local geography, nature, and ethnography.

In Russia local lore is known as krayevedenie (:ru:Краеведение). It is taught in primary schools. There are also local lore museums known as krayevedcheskie muzei. In modern Russia the concept of "regional studies" (:ru:Регионоведение) is also considered.

In Ukraine, the study of local history and regional ethnography is known as krayeznavstvo (:uk:краєзнавство). The National Union of Local Lore Researchers of Ukraine is a professional society for researchers of ethnology and local studies in Ukraine. It was founded in 1925 and has 3,000 members in 17 chapters. The society has published its journal Краєзнавство since 1927.

In Poland, the corresponding concept is called touring (:pl:Krajoznawstwo), the term known since 1902. In modern Poland various organized krajoznawstwo activities are carried out by Polskie Towarzystwo Turystyczno-Krajoznawcze, roughly translated as "Polish Tourist and Sightseeing Society".

See also
 Chorography
 English local history
 Family history
 Historic preservation
 Microhistory
 One-place study
 Rural history
 American urban history

References

Further reading
 
Celoria, Francis (1958) Teach Yourself Local History. London: English Universities Press
Hey, David (1996) The Oxford Companion to Local and Family History. Oxford University Press.  (as editor)
 Hey, David. (1997; published online 2003) The Oxford Dictionary of Local and Family History 
 Morrill, John. "The Diversity of Local History." Historical Journal 24, no. 3 (1981): 717-29. online on England.
  (fulltext)
Richardson, John (1974) The Local Historian's Encyclopedia. New Barnet: Historical Publications
Rogers, Alan (1972) This Was their World: approaches to local history. London: BBC (to accompany the BBC radio series broadcast Apr.-Jun. & Oct.-Dec. 1972)

External links

 American Local History Network, United States.
 Local History from the National Archives, UK.
 Local History Trails from the BBC.
 

Library guides
 

 
Community
Cultural history
Social history
History